The Ten Computational Canons was a collection of ten Chinese mathematical works, compiled by early Tang dynasty mathematician Li Chunfeng (602–670), as the official mathematical texts for imperial examinations in mathematics.

The Ten Computational Canons includes:
Zhoubi Suanjing (Zhou Shadow Mathematical Classic)
Jiuzhang Suanshu (The Nine Chapters on the Mathematical Art)
Haidao Suanjing (The Sea Island Mathematical Classic)
Sunzi Suanjing (The Mathematical Classic of Sun Zi)
Zhang Qiujian Suanjing (The Mathematical Classic of Zhang Qiujian)
Wucao Suanjing (Computational Canon of the Five Administrative Sections)
Xiahou Yang Suanjing (The Mathematical Classic of Xiahou Yang)
Wujing Suanshu (Computational Prescriptions of the Five Classics)
Jigu Suanjing (Continuation of Ancient Mathematical Classic)
Zhui Shu (Method of Interpolation)

It was specified in Tang dynasty laws on examination that Sunzi Suanjing and the Computational Canon of the Five Administrative Sections together required one year of study; The Nine Chapters on the Mathematical Art plus Haidao Suanjing three years; Jigu Suanjing three years; Zhui Shu four years; and Zhang Qiujian and Xia Houyang one year each.

The government of the Song dynasty actively promoted the study of mathematics. There were two government xylograph editions of The Ten Computational Canons in the years 1084 and 1213. The wide availability of these mathematical texts contributed to the flourishing of mathematics in the Song and Yuan dynasties, inspiring mathematicians such as Jia Xian, Qin Jiushao, Yang Hui, Li Zhi and Zhu Shijie.

In the Ming dynasty during the reign of the Yongle Emperor, some of the Ten Canons were copied into the Yongle Encyclopedia. During the reign of the Qianlong Emperor in the Qing dynasty, scholar Dai Zhen made copies of the Zhoubi Suanjing, The Nine Chapters on the Mathematical Art, Haidao Suanjing, Sunzi Suanjing, Zhang Qiujian Suanjing, Computational Canon of the Five Administrative Sections, Xiahou Yang Suanjing, Computational Prescriptions of the Five Classics, Jigu Suanjing, and Shushu Jiyi from the Yongle Encyclopedia and transferred them into another encyclopedia, the Siku Quanshu.

References
 Jean Claude Martzloff, A History of Chinese Mathematics,  pp. 123–126. .

Mathematics manuscripts
Chinese mathematics